Luiz dal Canalle Filho Airport  is the airport serving Toledo, Brazil.

It is operated by the Municipality of Toledo under the supervision of Aeroportos do Paraná (SEIL).

History
The airport was commissioned on January 24, 1954.

Airlines and destinations

Access

See also

List of airports in Brazil

References

External links

Airports in Paraná (state)
Toledo, Paraná